Sandefjord District Court is a district court located in Sandefjord, Norway.  It covers the municipality of Sandefjord and is subordinate Agder Court of Appeal.

References

External links 
Official site 

Defunct district courts of Norway
Organisations based in Sandefjord